Avena byzantina, red oats, is a species of cultivated oat native to Greece, Turkey, Cyprus, the Transcaucasus, Iran, and Saudi Arabia. Cultivated for thousands of years, it is better suited to warmer conditions than white or common oats (Avena sativa), but is often sown as a notill winter crop. There are 564 landraces and 203 cultivars of red oats listed in the European Plant Genetic Resources Search Catalogue (EURISCO). Approximately 10% of the millions of hectares worldwide under oats are devoted to red oats, principally for fodder.

References

Oats
Cereals
Fodder
byzantina
Plants described in 1848